Sant Joan de Labritja is a village and municipality of the Balearic Islands on northern Ibiza. Among others, the resorts of Portinatx and Cala de Sant Vicent are located there. The actual village of Sant Joan is a quiet street, dominated by an imposing Christian church, and is the meeting point of Sant Joan de Labritja Municipal Council. One may find several small cafés and restaurants (including the locally well-known Vista Alegre, as well as a taxi rank, outside the Municipal Council building and the local office of the Guardia Civil, the Spanish Civil Guard. Towards the west of the village is the origin of the Torrent de Labritja, a tributary of the Riu de Santa Eulária, the Balearic Island's only constant-flowing river, although the Torrent only contains water during the winter months; throughout the tourist season, the stream is a dry river bed full of green vegetation.

History 

For many years, especially throughout much of the 20th century, the municipality was known by its Spanish name, San Juan Bautista. However, in 1981, following the establishment of the Autonomous Region of the Balearic Islands, where Catalan was the official language, all place names were reverted to their Catalan names, in this case it became Sant Joan de Labritja.

Geography 

The municipality is the least-populated municipality in Ibiza, and is almost entirely rural. The village of Portinatx on the northern coast is the only major tourist resort as well as the western port of Sant Miquel (San Miguel).

Demographics

Tourism

Settlements 

The municipality encompasses the following towns and villages:

External links
 Town council website 
 Local government website
 Population of the Balearic Islands
 Google maps

See also
 The village of Sant Joan de Labritja

Municipalities in Ibiza
Bien de Interés Cultural landmarks in the Balearic Islands